Hybris (stylized as hybris) is a German company that sells enterprise omnichannel and product content management (PCM) software. It is a subsidiary of SAP SE.

Hybris was founded in Zug, Switzerland, in 1997 by Carsten Thoma, Moritz Zimmermann, Klaas Hermanns, Christian Flaccus and Andreas Bucksteeg. It subsequently moved its headquarters to Munich, Germany.

In 2011 private equity firm HGGC acquired a majority stake in Hybris and merged Canadian software company iCongo into Hybris.

SAP SE acquired Hybris on 1 August 2013 for $1.5 billion. In 2018, Hybris was integrated into the SAP Customer Experience division.

Hybris customers have included  General Electric, ABB, West Marine, COS, Thomson Reuters, 3M, Toys "R" Us, P&G, Levi's, Nikon and Johnson & Johnson.

References

Software companies established in 1997
Software companies of Germany
SAP SE acquisitions
German companies established in 1997